"Hey Mister (I Need This Job)" is a song recorded by American country music group Shenandoah.  It was released in August 1992 as the second single from the album Long Time Comin'.  The song reached #28 on the Billboard Hto Country Singles & Tracks chart.  The song was written by Kerry Chater and Renee Armand.

Critical reception
An uncredited review in Cash Box was positive, stating that it "will remind country listeners of what Shenandoah is all about. Orchestrated morality, family values, and rural mores."

Chart performance

References

1992 singles
1992 songs
Shenandoah (band) songs
Songs written by Kerry Chater
Song recordings produced by Keith Stegall
RCA Records singles